Moses-Columbia, or Columbia-Wenatchi, is a Southern Interior Salish language, also known as Nxaảmxcín.  Speakers currently reside on the Colville Indian Reservation. The Columbia people were followers of Chief Moses.

There are two dialects, Columbia (Sinkiuse, Columbian) and Wenatchi (Wenatchee, Entiat, Chelan). Wenatchi is the heritage language of the Wenatchi, Chelan, and Entiat tribes, Columbian of the Sinkiuse-Columbia.

Phonology 
Phonology of the Columbia-Wenatchi dialect:

The three vowels in Moses-Columbia are /i/, /a/, /u/. They are sometimes transcribed as [e]; /i/, [o]; /u/, and [æ]; /a/, and could also tend to sound unstressed, almost as a schwa sound, /ə/.

References

Further reading
 Czaykowska-Higgins, Ewa and Paul Proulx. 2000. "REVIEWS - What's in a Word? Structure in Moses-Columbia Salish". International Journal of American Linguistics. 66, no. 3: 410.
 Kinkade, M. Dale. Dictionary of the Moses-Columbia Language (Nxaʔamxcín). Nespelem, Wash: Colville Confederated Tribes, 1981.
 Mattina, Nancy. 2006. "Determiner Phrases in Moses-Columbia Salish". International Journal of American Linguistics. 72, no. 1: 97.
 Willet, Marie Louise. 2003." A Grammatical Sketch of Nxa'amxcin" PhD Thesis, University of Victoria.

Interior Salish languages
Indigenous languages of the North American Plateau
Extinct languages of North America
Indigenous languages of Washington (state)